Jerron McMillian (born April 2, 1989) is a former American football safety. He played college football at Maine. McMillian was drafted by the Green Bay Packers in the fourth round of the 2012 NFL Draft. He was also a member of the Kansas City Chiefs.

Early years
McMillian was born on April 2, 1989, the son of John and Rosemary McMillian. He attended Hillside High School, where he played quarterback and safety under coach Jim Hopke and served as team captain, earning all-state, all-county and All-Mountain Valley Conference honors. He also played basketball and was named to his high school's academic honor roll.

College career
McMillian played safety for the Maine Black Bears under head coach Jack Cosgrove. In McMillian's senior season he led a stout Maine defense to a #8 Ranking in the FBS and had 92 total tackles 61 solo and 31 assisted along with 11.5 tfl and 3.5 sacks with 1 interception and 5 breakups.

Professional career

Green Bay Packers
McMillian was selected in the fourth round (133rd overall) by the Green Bay Packers in the 2012 NFL Draft. On May 11, 2012, he signed a contract with the Packers.

On December 3, 2013, he was released by the Packers.

Kansas City Chiefs
McMillian signed with the Kansas City Chiefs on January 12, 2014. The Chiefs released McMillian on August 25, 2014.

Statistics
Source: NFL.com

References

External links

 Green Bay Packers bio
 Maine Black Bears bio
 

1989 births
Living people
American football safeties
Maine Black Bears football players
Green Bay Packers players
Kansas City Chiefs players
Hillside High School (New Jersey) alumni
People from Hillside, New Jersey
Sportspeople from Union County, New Jersey
Players of American football from Newark, New Jersey